The following lists events that happened during 2013 in the Democratic Republic of the Congo.

Incumbents 
 President: Joseph Kabila
 Prime Minister: Augustin Matata Ponyo

Events

January
 January 3 - The March 23 Movement in the Democratic Republic of Congo announces that peace talks will only commence if President Joseph Kabila's government signs a ceasefire.
 January 8 - The March 23 Movement announce a unilateral ceasefire ahead of peace talks with the government.

February
 February 24 - Eleven African nations including all the members of the African Great Lakes region sign a United Nations brokered peace deal for the eastern region of the Democratic Republic of the Congo.

March
 March 4 - A Fokker 50 operated by Compagnie Africaine d'Aviation crashes in poor weather at Goma. Nine people were in the aircraft, a crew of five and four passengers and at least three people survived the accident.
 Mai-Mai Kata Katanga unrest in Lubumbashi.

May
 May 15 - A rebel attack on army positions in Beni leaves at least 31 people dead, including 23 Mai Mai and three FARDC troops.
 May 23 - Ban Ki-moon, Secretary-General of the United Nations, visits the Democratic Republic of the Congo as fighting continues near the eastern city of Goma.

August
 August 23 - UN troops in the Democratic Republic of the Congo launch an offensive, shelling positions held by rebels near the eastern city of Goma.
 August 30 - M23 rebel chief says fighters to withdraw from frontline of fighting in country's east, as violence spikes.

References

 
2010s in the Democratic Republic of the Congo
Years of the 21st century in the Democratic Republic of the Congo
Democratic Republic of the Congo
Democratic Republic of the Congo